Marteilia is a protozoan genus of organisms that are parasites of bivalves. It causes QX disease in Sydney rock oysters and Aber disease in European flat oysters. After being infected by Marteilia, bivalves lose pigmentation in their visceral tissue and become emaciated (Carrasco, Green, & Itoh, 2015).

History
In the late 1960s and early 1970s, there was a huge decline in European flat oyster (Ostrea edulis) population in Brittany, France. This had a huge socioeconomic impact in Europe. Marteilia refringens was discovered to be the cause of this decline in oyster (Grizel et al., 1974). Around the same time, Marteilia sydneyi was also found to be causing mortalities in Sydney rock oyster (Saccostrea glomerate) in Australia (Perkins & Wolf, 1976).

There has been some success in breeding strains of Sydney rock oyster that are resistant to Marteilia ('QX disease').

Morphology
Marteilia has a very peculiar morphology. The outermost cell is the primary cell. Within the primary cell, there is a nucleus and between 3 and 16 secondary cells. Within a secondary cell, there is a nucleus and between 1 and 6 spores. Within each spore, there is a nucleus and another spore, which has yet another nucleus and spore within. This spore within a spore within a spore is termed a tricellular spore. Marteilia has tricellular spores where as the similar genera Paramarteilia and Paramyxa have bicellular and tetracellular spores respectively (Feist, Hine, Bateman, Stentiford, & Longshaw, 2009).

Cell Cycle
Marteilia’s morphology is derived from its unique cell cycle. The primary cell undergoes mitosis and produces the secondary cell within the primary cell rather than outside the primary cell. The secondary cell then undergoes mitosis to produce more secondary cells. After reaching a certain number of secondary cells, each secondary cell then undergoes mitosis to produce a spore within itself. The spores undergo a series of endogenous mitosis until it becomes a tricellular spore (Feist, Hine, Bateman, Stentiford, & Longshaw, 2009).

Life Cycle
Marteilia begins its life cycle by infecting the gills of bivalves. At the gills, it undergoes sporogony where it replicates endogenously, producing secondary cells. Marteilia then enters the haemolymph and is transported then to the host's digestive tubule. Once there, it attaches itself to the digestive tubule epithelium and undergoes sporulation. After producing many spores, Marteilia enters its final stage and ruptures, releasing the spores. Currently, changes to Marteilia spores after release are unknown but it is assumed that some eventually reach another host's gills and repeat its cycle in its new host. (Kleeman, Adlard, & Lester, 2002)

Marteilia Species
 Marteilia christenseni Comps 1985
 Marteilia chungmuensis (Comps, Park & Desportes 1986) Feist et al. 2009
 Marteilia cochillia Carrasco et al. 2013: a species that infects the cockle Cerastoderma edule (Carrasco et al., 2013)
 Marteilia granula Itoh et al. 2014: a species that infects the Manila clam Ruditapes philippinarum (Itoh et al., 2014)
 Marteilia lengehi Comps 1976
 Marteilia maurini Comps, Pichot & Papagianni 1992
 Marteilia octospora Ruiz et al. 2016: a species that infects the Grooved Razor Shell clam Solen marginatus (Ruiz, López, Lee, Rodríguez, & Darriba, 2016)
Marteilia pararefringens Bass, Stentiford & Kerr 2017: a species that infects the Blue mussel Mytilus edulis (Kerr et al., 2018)
 Marteilia refringens Grizel et al. 1974: a species that infects the European flat oyster Ostrea edulis (Grizel et al., 1974)
 Marteilia sydneyi Perkins & Wolf 1976: a species that infects the Sydney rock oyster Saccostrea glomerata (Perkins & Wolf, 1976)
 Marteilia tapetis Kang et al. 2019

References
 Carrasco, N., Green, T., & Itoh, N. (2015). Marteilia spp. parasites in bivalves: A revision of recent studies. Journal of Invertebrate Pathology,131, 43–57. doi:10.1016/j.jip.2015.07.016
 Carrasco, N., Hine, P. M., Durfort, M., Andree, K. B., Malchus, N., Lacuesta, B., . . . Furones, M. D. (2013). Marteilia cochillia sp. nov., a new Marteilia species affecting the edible cockle Cerastoderma edule in European waters. Aquaculture,412-413, 223–230. doi:10.1016/j.aquaculture.2013.07.027
 Cavalier-Smith, T. (2017). Kingdom Chromista and its eight phyla: a new synthesis emphasising periplastid protein targeting, cytoskeletal and periplastid evolution, and ancient divergences. Protoplasma,255(1), 297–357. doi:10.1007/s00709-017-1147-3
 Feist S. W., Hine P. M., Bateman K. S., Stentiford G. D., & Longshaw M. (2009). Paramarteilia canceri sp. n. (Cercozoa) in the European edible crab (Cancer pagurus) with a proposal for the revision of the order Paramyxida Chatton, 1911. Folia parasitologica, 56(2), 73-85
 Grizel, H., Comps, M., Bonami, J.R., Cousserans, F., Duthoit, J.L., Le Pennec, M.A. (1974). Recherches sur l’agent de la maladie de la glande digestive de Ostrea edulis Linné. Sci. Pêche, Bull. Inst. Pêches Marit. 240, 7–30
 Itoh, N., Yamamoto, T., Kang, H. S., Choi, K. S., Green, T. J., Carrasco, N., ... Chow, S. (2014). A novel paramyxean parasite, Marteilia granula sp. nov. (Cercozoa), from the digestive gland of Manila clam Ruditapes philippinarum in Japan. Fish Pathology, 49(4), 181–193.
Kerr, R., Ward, G.M., Stentiford, G.D., Alfjorden, A., Mortensen, S., Bignell, J.P., Feist S.W., Villalba, A., Carballal, M.J., Cao, A., Arzul, I., Ryder, D., Bass D. (2018). Marteilia refringens and Marteilia pararefringens sp. nov. are distinct parasites of bivalves and have different European distributions. Parasitology, 145(11), 1483–1492. doi: 10.1017/S003118201800063X
 Kleeman, S. N., Adlard, R. D., & Lester, R. J. G. (2002). Detection of the initial infective stages of the protozoan parasite Marteilia sydneyi in Saccostrea glomerata and their development through to sporogenesis International Journal for Parasitology,32(6), 767-784 doi: 10.1016/S0020-7519(02)00025-5
 Perkins, F. O., & Wolf, P. H. (1976). Fine Structure of Marteilia sydneyi sp. n.: Haplosporidan Pathogen of Australian Oysters. The Journal of Parasitology,62(4), 528. doi:10.2307/3279407
 Ruiz, M., López, C., Lee, R., Rodríguez, R., & Darriba, S. (2016). A novel paramyxean parasite, Marteilia octospora n. sp. (Cercozoa) infecting the Grooved Razor Shell clam Solen marginatus from Galicia (NW Spain). Journal of Invertebrate Pathology,135, 34–42. doi:10.1016/j.jip.2016.02.002

Specific

Cercozoa genera
Stellatosporea